Yung-Ping High School (aka YungPing and YongPing), officially named "New Taipei City Yung-Ping High School", founded in 1971 as a junior high school (grade 7–9), named "Yung-Ping Junior High School".
In 1995, this school changed its name to the present one, combining senior high school (grade 10–12) and junior high school levels. It is the first local public high school in Yung-Ho City.

Location
Yung-Ping High School located in the west part of Yonghe District, New Taipei City. RenAi Park and Lehwa Night Market are nearby.

See also
 Education in Taiwan

References

External links 
 Yung-Ping High School website

1971 establishments in Taiwan
Educational institutions established in 1971
High schools in Taiwan
Schools in New Taipei